Lin Hsin Hsin is an IT inventor, artist, poet and composer from Singapore, deeply rooted in mathematics and information technology.

Early life and education
Lin was born in Singapore. She graduated in mathematics from the University of Singapore and received a postgraduate degree in computer science from Newcastle University, England. She studied music and art in Singapore, printmaking at the University of Ulster, papermaking in Ogawamachi, Japan and paper conservation at the University of Melbourne Conservation Services.

Career
Lin is a digital native. Lin builds paradigm shift & patent-grade inventions.She is an IT visionary some 20 years ahead of time, who pens her IT vision in computing, poems, and paintings.

In 1976, Lin painted "Distillation of an Apple", an oil painting claimed to visualised the construction and usage of Apple computer 7 days before the birth of Apple computer. In 1977, she painted "The Computer as Architect", an oil painting depicting the vision of the power of computer in architecture. Lin claimed she has never seen nor used a Computer-aided design (CAD) system prior to her painting while commercial CAD systems are available since early 1970s.

 1988 March organized 1st Artificial Intelligence conference in Singapore
 1991 February 1 poem titled "Cellular Phone Galore" predicted mobile phone, & cellular network BEFORE 2G GSM launch, 27 March 1991, p.  54,55, "from time to time"
 1992 wanted to build a multimedia museum (letter to National Computer Board, Singapore)
 1993 February, predicted the Y2K bug while building a ten-year forecasting model on an IBM i486 PC, Journal of the Asia Pacific Economic Conference (APEC), 1999
1993 August 21, poem title "Online Intimacy" on Online dating service, p. 235, "Sunny Side Up"
1993 August 23, poem titled "Till Bankrupt Do Us Part", on online shopping & e-commerce, p. 241, "Sunny Side Up"
 1994 May, painted "Voices of the Future" – oil painting depicted the wireless and mobile entertainment future lifestyle, p. 32, "Lin Hsin Hsin: Works from Art, Science & Technology Series"
 1994 Designed and built a virtual museum in the world,
 1995 September 9, poem titled "Virtual Offices" predicted virtual office as the concept of businesses, p. 20, "In Bytes We Travel"
 1995 September 9, poem titled "The Day Will Come..." on SMS, using fingers to type on screen, p. 181, "In Bytes We Travel"
 1996 October, predicted Twitter, tweeting as a way of life. in a diptych titled "twigee-tweedee", digital art in private collection, Paris, France

 1996 October 1, poem titled "e-money" on digital currency & Cryptocurrency p. 58, "In Bytes We Travel"
 1999 February 1, poem titled "Mobility" on mobility, p. 20, "Between the Lines"

IT Inventions 
 2018 May 19 Next Generation 100%  Directed Acyclic Graph DAG-based blockchain protocol 
 2017 Nov 11 Encryption Algorithm
 2017 FACT Finger on Android Circling Techniques—A Finger Intelligence Technology (FIT 3.0) on Android
 2016 <PugScript>-- A Visual Language on Android
 2016 4 new mathematical theorems, launched in London, June 2016
 2016 STEP Sustainable Time-motion Enabled Power—A Finger Intelligence Technology (FIT 3.0) on Android
 2015 FAME Finger/Fist Accelerated Mathematical Engine—A Finger Intelligence Technology (FIT 3.0) on Android
 2013 TANGO Touch ANd GO—A Finger Intelligence Technology (FIT 3.0) on Android
 2007 MedTECH 20/20 visions for all ages—POC done
 2007 Super Image File Shrinkage for JPEG files

Startup 
 2018 SpaceGraph™ founder
 2014 Founder Lin Hsin Hsin Intelligence Center 
 2017 Blockchain  Threats Intelligence
 2016 Biometrics Threats Intelligence
 2016 Data Science
 2006 IoT

Contemporary Art

Paintings and sculptures
Lin Hsin Hsin specialises in oil painting, she has transformed the opaque properties of oil paint to make it translucent in 1988. As such, she has made oil paint to look like watercolor, Chinese ink as well as pastel, pencil or charcoal, as demonstrated in the Aqua Series of paintings. Besides oil paintings, she makes acrylic sculptures.

Art Exhibitions
Lin Hsin Hsin has held 15 solo exhibitions in Singapore, Amsterdam, and San Jose, California, United States. She has participated in more than 220 exhibitions in 60 cities, 26 countries across Asia, Europe, North America and South America.

Art Collectors
Lin's art can be seen in private, public and museum collections in 32 cities across Asia, Europe, North America and Australia. In 1985, she was awarded a silver medal by the Société des Artistes Français, Paris. In 1987, Lin received the IBM Singapore Art Award, she has received Visiting Fellowship to Germany in 1988 and Japan Foundation Fellowship in 1991 Her artworks are in private, public and museum collections in Asia, Europe and North America.

Paper
Besides paper sculptures, papier collé, collograph and monoprints, Lin handmade acid-free paper. She has pioneered acid-free papaya paper and umbrella plant paper in 1992.

Digital Media

Digital Media Pioneer

Lin is a digital media pioneer,
She has created digital music in 1985, 3D digital art in 1987, and digital animation in 1989 in Singapore.  Since 1993 to date, Lin has pioneered the use of a two-button mechanical PC Mouse to draw and paint Western and Chinese paintings. She has created digital oil paintings, watercolors, Chinese ink paintings and calligraphy. She also digitally sketches with this mouse. Hsin Hsin has never and does not use any tablet PC and stylus in such creation. More than 250 digitally created artworks were exhibited in 1997 in her 15th solo exhibition in Singapore.

Virtual Museum

In 1994, Lin set up a virtual museum the Lin Hsin Hsin Art Museum

Digital Art
Lin Hsin Hsin Started from the real-world, in 1985, she moved into the digital world.

However, Lin has, since 1994, began with the digital, and fabricated the digital into the real

Lin Hsin Hsin created Web art and Net art in 1995, HTML art in 1996 and she has developed interactive Web art since 1997. Lin pioneered virtual sculpting in 1999 in Singapore; it was exhibited in Paris, France in 1999, 2001, and 2003.

ISM
Lin believes in Mathematical & Computing fundamentals, she anchors on science to create art. She
 forbids drag & drop, scan & morph, cut & paste processes to create digital art.
 established Eco-computing initiatives for digital media in 2007.
 algorithm driven & equation-based
 Linux platform

Genres
Lin initiates, establishes and creates different genres of digital art:

 Non-Photorealistic Rendering Images (NPR) by a hand held device (mouse)
 Images include digital oil paintings, digital watercolor, digital cartoons, digital Chinese ink, digital crayons, digital pencils, etc.
 Photorealistic Images by a hand held device (mouse)
 Images include digital oil paintings, digital watercolor, digital Chinese ink, digital crayons, digital pencils, etc.
 Mathematical art
 2D – still images include: 253 categories of digital fabrics, digital coin
 3D – still and animated. Computation-based digital voyages; 3D modelling digital sculptures, 3D modelling digital objects
 Grid Geometry art
 2D Grid Geometry art
 2D Interactive Grid Geometry Art
 2D Perception-Based Art
 3D Perception-Based Art
 lenticular, coleuraille
 Stereoscopic 3D
 Equation-based art
 2D – still and animated. Images include digital oil and digital watercolor.
 3D – still and animated digital sculptures, digital jewelry digital objects. digital furnitures,
 All 2D and 3D equation-based art can be realised and fabricated into real-world entities.
 Web-based art
 2D – still, animated and interactive.
 3D – still, animated and interactive.
 ICP (In-Camera Painting)
 Literary Art
 Art based on a word meaning, as it is, homograph, homonym or heteronym, usually pun included. 
 Android Smartphone Platform—FIT (Finger Intelligence Technologies) 
 2D: finger digital painting without image editing software
 animated and/performance, interactive 
 2D: interactive finger Shimmering Pixels Assimilated Resistive Touchscreen Kindle ILuminated Emissions (SPARKLE) on Android, in Real Time.
 abstract
  calligraphic
  photorealistic
 3D: finger digital sculptures 
 4D: finger gestures and finger choreography enabled live 3D performance 
 4D: live 3D performance

EMOJI CITY
Lin initiates and creates different genres of emoji, still and animated. She built and launched an Emoji City,  12 September 2016.

BLOCKMOJI
Lin initiates and creates different genres of blockmoji—An emoji genre for blockchain, both still and animated. She launched Blockmoji, 8 August 2018.

Music

Digital music
From conceptualisation to composing, from sound calibration to mastering, Lin has produced music on a PC without a sound card and midi instruments. Lin creates virtual instruments including a virtual didgeridoo, a berimbau used by the Brazilian aborigines. In 2006, Lin has realised the sonification of nature, including a rainforest, waterfalls and wind by an interactive virtual sound board she has created. Hsin Hsin's music has been performed in Vienna, Austria in 2002, Bourges, France in 2003, 2004 and Pisa, Italy, 2005.

Music visualisation
Lin has composed music and painted music as an artist. The 45 paintings in the "Abstraction in Music" Series (1986–1987) is her interpretation of music on canvas, as she is moved by the music of great composers such as Handel (Water Music), Mozart (Jupiter Symphony), Franz Liszt (Rhapsodies dan l'espace), Vivaldi (The Four Seasons), Debussy (La Mer). In addition to the canvases, there are the paperworks subtitled "La Petite Séries" created with different techniques, an abstraction of audio visualisation—perceived images of the sound in music such as Musical Ornaments: Trill, Appoggiatura and Turn (Staccato) and sound in the universe like Woodpecker.

Lin has conceptualised and written about the art in music and music in art. Since 2002, Hsin Hsin has digitally created visual music, or animated music, as she puts it.

2005, Lin built wearables and lights that response to music.

2006, Lin built paradigm shift interactive digital real-world musical instruments—I-Musika

Interactive music
Lin developed an interactive Music Sound Board in 2006. The creation of this soft sound board enables real time creation of the sound of nature. Examples are elements of sound audible in nature, such as rain forest, insects, water, and wind.

Bibliography 
Lin is an author of 75 books, including ten poetry books.

Poetry Books 

 
 
 

 
 
 
 "To The Point", 2010
 "iWrite", 2011,

Contemporary art books

Digital media 
 "Perception-based Art" 2011, 
 "The Art of Mondriaan by Lin Hsin Hsin", 2011, 
 "A New Paradigm for Visualization and Generating Grid Geometry Art and Beyond" 2010, 
 "bel canto, Volume VIII: leaves n petals", 2010, 
 "bel canto, Volume VII: blobs n spots", 2010, 
 "bel canto, Volume VI: blue n white", 2010, 
 "bel canto, Volume V: the fabric of vision", 2010, 
 "bel canto, Volume IV: in focus", 2010, 
 "bel canto, Volume III: between the lines", 2010, 
 "bel canto, Volume II: when black meets white", 2010, 
 "bel canto, Volume I: bird entering the teatro", 2010, 
 "Voice Over Intellectual Properties By Lin Hsin Hsin Volume III: Classic", 2010, 
 "Voice Over Intellectual Properties by Lin Hsin Hsin, Volume II: Paper As A Medium", 2010, 
 "Voice Over Intellectual Properties by Lin Hsin Hsin, Volume I: Digital Media", 2010, 
 "Painterly Yours", 2009, 
 "The Art of i,j,k", 2010, 
 "The A – Z of Visualization", 2010, 
 "What is in a Brush", 2008, 
 "The Automorphism of Amalgamation Polytopes and Tessellation", 2008, 
 "A New Paradigm for Visualization and Generating Grid Geometry Art", 2007, 
 "When Equations Paints", 2007, 
 "Every Pixel Counts", 2003, 
 "@art : A Cyberart show by Lin Hsin Hsin", 1997,

Digital music

References

External links
 RADIOTOPIA :: persons :: Lin Hsin Hsin :: [Artist] :
 Lin Hsin Hsin biodata.
 Biography, Museums and the Web conference, 1998.
 Lin Hsin Hsin: An Overview from the National University of Singapore University Scholars Programme website.
 The intellectual properties of Lin Hsin Hsin.

Year of birth missing (living people)
Living people
Singaporean people of Chinese descent
University of Singapore alumni
Alumni of Newcastle University
Singaporean artists
Singaporean poets
Singaporean painters
Singaporean composers
Singaporean inventors
Digital artists
Singaporean women poets
Singaporean women painters
Women composers
Women inventors
Mathematical artists